Bařice-Velké Těšany is a municipality in Kroměříž District in the Zlín Region of the Czech Republic. It has about 400 inhabitants.

Administrative parts
The municipality is made up of villages of Bařice and Velké Těšany.

References

Villages in Kroměříž District